List of ships with the name SS Great Republic
 , a passenger-cargo ship built in 1866-67 for the Pacific Mail Steamship Company, and the largest steamship then built in the United States 
 , a stores ship originally named SS Great Republic 

Type C2-S-B1 ships